Glucocorticoid receptor DNA-binding factor 1 is a protein that in humans is encoded by the GRLF1 gene.

Function 

The human glucocorticoid receptor DNA binding factor, which associates with the promoter region of the glucocorticoid receptor gene (hGR gene), is a repressor of glucocorticoid receptor transcription. The amino acid sequence deduced from the cDNA sequences show the presence of three sequence motifs characteristic of a zinc finger and one motif suggestive of a leucine zipper in which 1 cysteine is found instead of all leucines. The GRLF1 enhances the homologous down-regulation of wild-type hGR gene expression. Biochemical analysis suggests that GRLF1 interaction is sequence specific and that transcriptional efficacy of GRLF1 is regulated through its interaction with specific sequence motif. The level of expression is regulated by glucocorticoids.

References

Further reading

External links 
 
GRLF1 Info with links in the Cell Migration Gateway 

Transcription factors